The Trinity Lakes AVA is an American Viticultural Area in Trinity County, California.  The boundaries of the AVA surround Trinity Lake and Lewiston Lake and includes a portion of the Trinity River basin below Lewiston Dam.

The AVA has one commercial winery, Alpen Cellars.

References

American Viticultural Areas
American Viticultural Areas of California
Geography of Trinity County, California
2005 establishments in California